Marcus Rivers (born August 2, 1989) is a former American football wide receiver. He played college football at the University of Buffalo. He signed with the Green Bay Packers as an undrafted free agent in 2012.

Professional career

Green Bay Packers
On May 11, 2012, he signed with the Green Bay Packers as an undrafted free agent. On June 1, 2012, he was waived by the Packers.

Edmonton Eskimos
On April 18, 2013, he was released before the 2013 CFL season began.

Baltimore Ravens
On June 4, 2013, he signed with the Baltimore Ravens. On August 11, 2013, he was waived by the Ravens.

Pittsburgh Power
On November 15, 2014, Rivers was assigned to the Pittsburgh Power of the Arena Football League. The Power folded in November 2014.

References

External links
Buffalo Bulls bio
Green Bay Packers bio
Baltimore Ravens bio 

1989 births
Living people
Baltimore Ravens players
Pittsburgh Power players
American football wide receivers
People from Lackawanna, New York
Players of American football from New York (state)
Buffalo Bulls football players